Blackwood F.C. was a football club based in Solihull, West Midlands..

History
Blackwood Football Club was formed in 1964 and played Sunday league football until the club joined the Midland Football Combination Division Three in 2009–10. The club won the league in its first season and was promoted to Division Two. The following year, Blackwood again won the league and gained promotion to Division One. In 2011–12, the club secured its third successive title and was promoted to the Premier Division for 2012–13,  the club's first season at level 10 of the English football league system.  The club was initially allocated a place in the newly formed Midland Football League in 2014, but subsequently withdrew.

Ground
Blackwood play at The Coppice, Tythe Barn Lane, Shirley, Solihull.

Honours
Midland Football Combination Division One
Champions 2011–12
Midland Football Combination Division Two
Champions 2010–11
Midland Football Combination Division Three
Champions 2009–10
Challenge Urn Winners 2009–10

Festival League Premier Division One
Promoted 2008–09
Festival League Division One
Promoted 2007–08
Festival League Division Two
Promoted 2006–07

Records
FA Vase
Second Qualifying Round 2013–14

References

External links

Defunct football clubs in England
Defunct football clubs in the West Midlands (county)
Midland Football Combination
Association football clubs established in 1964
1964 establishments in England
Association football clubs disestablished in 2014
2014 disestablishments in England